Cleistachne is a genus of African and Asian plants in the grass family. The only known species is Cleistachne sorghoides, native to Eastern Africa and Southeastern Africa (from Ethiopia to Mpumalanga), and parts of Asia (Oman, Odisha State in India).

References

Andropogoneae
Monotypic Poaceae genera
Flora of Asia
Flora of Africa